Ola Sa'ad Ibrahim  (born 15 June 1955) is a retired Nigerian Navy admiral and former Chief of the Defence Staff of the Nigerian Armed Forces.

Educated at Ahmadu Bello University (LLB) and King's College London (MA, War Studies), Ibrahim had his military training at the Nigerian Defence Academy and the Armed Forces Command and Staff College, Jaji. He served as Chief of the Naval Staff from 2010 to 2012, and as Chief of the Defence Staff from 2012 to 2014.

References

1955 births
Living people
Ahmadu Bello University alumni
Alumni of King's College London
Nigerian Navy admirals
Yoruba military personnel
Nigerian Defence Academy alumni
Chiefs of Naval Staff (Nigeria)
Yoruba people